Ah Boys to Men 3: Frogmen (literally: "Recruits' True Biography") is a 2015 Singaporean military comedy film produced and directed by Jack Neo. It stars Wang Weiliang, Maxi Lim, Joshua Tan, Charlie Goh, Tosh Zhang, Jaspers Lai and Wesley Wong and in the third installment. It was released in cinemas on 19 February 2015. The film raked in $2.83 million at the box office within four days, making it the first Asian film with the highest ever box office takings in its opening weekend in Singapore.

Premise
The film negates all happenings in the predecessors and explores what might have happened should the boys have been assigned to Singapore's Naval Diving Unit (NDU). The movie offers a peek into the intensive training regime of the NDU, which had never been revealed so far. Together, the boys must survive 40 weeks of hell to become Frogmen, one of Singapore's most fearsome military units.

Cast
 Wang Weiliang as 3SG Bang "Lobang" Lee Onn
 Maxi Lim as 3SG Aloysius Jin aka Wayang King
 Joshua Tan as 3SG Ken Chow
 Charlie Goh as CPL Tan Wei Ming
 Tosh Zhang as 3WO Alex Ong
 Jaspers Lai as CPL Handsome 
 Wesley Wong as 3SG Shek Hak Long aka Hei Long
 Bunz Bao as CPL Sam Hui
 Hanrey Low as CPL Henry
 Justin Dominic Misson as 2WO Lum Ber Toh, B T Lum aka No. 2
 Fish Chaar as CPT Max Chow
 Gadrick Chin as Sha Bao 傻豹 
 Joey Leong as Lo Wei 罗薇, Lobang's sister
 Richard Low as Ken's father
 Irene Ang as Mary Chow, Ken's mother
 Yoo Ah Min as Ken's grandmother
 Wang Lei as Ken's uncle
 Aileen Tan as Lobang's mother
 Hayley Woo as Amy, Ken's girlfriend
 Chen Tianwen as Mr. Jin, Aloysius' father
 Ye Li Mei as Mrs. Jin, Aloysius' mother
 Colonel Tan Hong Teck cameo as himself, Commander, Naval Diving Unit
 Noah Yap as Man In Ping a.k.a. IP Man, only appears in the credits
 Yung Raja

Production
The film was shot at the Naval Diving Unit in Sembawang Camp.
The film was written by Jack Neo (梁智强) & Ivan Ho (夏友庆), and the film being directed by Jack Neo (梁智强).

Music
The official theme song of Ah Boys to Men 3: Frogmen, titled "Who Else", was written, composed and performed by Tosh Zhang, a YouTube personality who is part of the cast in the film. An official music video was uploaded on YouTube on February 4, 2015.

The OST of Ah Boys to Men 3: Frogmen, titled "Why Me", was uploaded on YouTube on May 16, 2015.

Home media

Ah Boys to Men 3 Edition was released on DVD on 8 May 2015.

Reception
The film was expected to be a hit with profits estimated to surpass over $3 million at the box office after release. Singapore Box Office reported that an estimated $7.63 million have been grossed between the dates of 19 February and 7 May. By the end of its theatrical run, the film had grossed $7.8 million, which was $0.1 million below the second installment's grossing's but $1.5 million higher than the first installment.

This movie has been widely panned by critics and movie viewers worldwide, often calling out the "violence, abuse, torture and misuse of sergeants and soldiers" and "claimed simply unsettling and cringey".

See also
 List of Singaporean films of 2015
 Army Daze
 Ah Boys to Men
 Naval Diving Unit

References

External links

 

2015 films
2015 comedy-drama films
2010s English-language films
Hokkien-language films
2010s Mandarin-language films
Singaporean comedy films
Films directed by Jack Neo
Films shot in Singapore
Films set in Singapore
Films set in 2015
Films about navies
Singaporean multilingual films